Angus is a masculine given name in English. It is an Anglicised form of the Scottish Gaelic and Irish Aonghas, which is composed of Celtic elements meaning "one" and "choice". A variant spelling of the Scottish Gaelic name is Aonghus. The Irish form of the Scottish Gaelic name is Aengus. A pet form of the given name Angus is Angie, pronounced "an-ghee", which represents the Scottish Gaelic Angaidh. A short form of the given name Angus is Gus, which may be lengthened to Gussie. The feminine form of Angus is Angusina. 

The earliest form of the given name Angus, and its cognates, occurs in Adomnán's Vita Columbae (English: "Life of Columba") as Oinogusius, Oinogussius. This name likely refers to a Pictish king whose name is recorded variously as Onnust, Hungus. According to historian Alex Woolf, the early Gaelic form of the name, Oengus, was borrowed from the Pictish Onuist, which appears in British as Ungust. Woolf noted that these names are all derived from the Celtic *Oinogustos. Linguist John Kneen derived this name from two Celtic elements the following way: *Oino-gustos, meaning "one-choice". Woolf also stated that between about AD 350 and AD 660, the Insular Celtic dialects underwent changes which included the loss of the final syllables and unstressed vowels, which affected *Oinogustos thus: *Oinogustos.

Variations

People with the given name
 Aenghus Ua Flainn (died 1036), Abbot of Clonfert
 Aengus Mac Grianna (born 1964), Irish newsreader for Raidió Teilifís Éireann (RTÉ)
 Angus Abbey (born 1925), Australian rules football player
 Angus Abranson, game publisher
 Angus Allan (1936–2007), British comic strip writer and magazine editor
 Angus B. Rothwell (1905–1981), Superintendent of Public Instruction of Wisconsin
 Angus Baker (1849–1924), navigator, ship's captain and political figure in Quebec
 Angus Barnett (born 1963), English actor
 Angus Beith (born 1996), Scottish footballer
 Angus Bernard MacEachern (1759–1835), Scottish Bishop in the Roman Catholic Church
 Angus Bethune (disambiguation)
 Angus Black (born 1925), Scottish international rugby union player
 Angus M. Bowie (born 1949), British classicist
 Angus Brandt (born 1989), Australian professional basketball player
 Angus Brayshaw (born 1996), Australian rules footballer
 Angus Buchanan (disambiguation)
 Angus Cameron (disambiguation)
 Angus Cameron (American politician) (1826–1897), American politician
 Angus Cameron (academic) (1941–1983), Canadian linguist
 Angus Cameron (director), British director
 Angus Campbell (disambiguation)
 Angus Clark, guitarist, singer, songwriter, and producer
 Angus Cloud, American actor
 Angus Cottrell (born 1989), Australian rugby union footballer
 Angus Creelman Ree (1929–2009), lawyer and political figure in British Columbia
 Angus Deaton (born 1945), British-American economist and recipient of the Nobel Memorial Prize in Economic Sciences 
 Angus Deayton (born 1956), British comedian
 Angus Donald (born 1965), English author
 Angus Douglas-Hamilton (1863–1915), Scottish recipient of the Victoria Cross
 Angus Douglas-Hamilton, 15th Duke of Hamilton (1938–2010), also has subsidiary title as the 22nd Earl of Angus
 Angus Falconer Douglas-Hamilton (1863–1915), Scottish recipient of the Victoria Cross
 Angus Duford (1891-1950), Canadian professional ice hockey player
 Angus Dun (1892–1971), American bishop
 Angus Dunlop (born 1967), Irish cricketer
 Angus Dunnington (born 1967), English poker, online gambling specialist, and professional chess player
 Angus Edmond (born 1976), New Zealand male cyclo-cross cyclist
 Angus Finlay Hutton (born 1928), British naturalist born in India
 Angus Fletcher, a British businessman and member of the Legislative Council of Hong Kong
 Angus Fogg (born 1967), championship winning New Zealand racecar driver
 Angus Frantz (1895–1973), American wrestler
 Angus Fraser (born 1965), English cricketer in the 1980s and 1990s
 Angus Fregon (1880–1956), Australian rules footballer
 Angus Gardner (born 1984), Australian professional rugby union referee
 Angus Gibson (1842–1920), sugar planter and politician
 Angus Goetz (1897–1977), American football player
 Angus Graham (disambiguation)
 Angus Hambro (1883–1957), British Conservative Party politician
 Angus Harris (born 1977), Australian businessman
 Angus Harrison (born 1992), British actor from Bristol, England
 Angus Houston (born 1947), Australian soldier
 Angus T. Jones (born 1993), Two and a Half Men actor
 Angus W. Kerr (1873–1927), American politician
 Angus King (born 1944), 72nd Governor of Maine
 Angus Konstam (born 1960), Scottish author and historian
 Angus Lennie (born 1930), Scottish actor 
 Angus MacAskill (1825–1862), tallest non-pathological giant in recorded history
 Angus MacGyver title character and protagonist on ABC television series MacGyver (1985-1992); originally played by Richard Dean Anderson. In the 2016 reboot: played by Lucas Till
 Angus Mackay (born 1939), Scottish historian
 Angus MacLise (born 1938), American musician
 Angus D. MacMillan (1839–1884), merchant and political figure on Prince Edward Island
 Angus Matheson (1912–1962), inaugural Professor of Celtic at the University of Glasgow
 Angus McLaren (born 1988), Australian actor
 Angus Monfries (born 1987), Australian rules footballer
 Angus Robertson (born 1969), Scottish politician
 Angus Scrimm (1926–2016), actor and author
 Angus Stone (born 1986), Australian folk-blues singer-songwriter and record producer-engineer
 Angus G. Wynne (1914–1979), American businessman
 Angus Young (born 1955), Scottish-born Australian guitarist from the band AC/DC
 Angus Wall (born 1967), American film editor
 Alan Young (born Angus Young) (1919-2016), star of Mister Ed

References

English-language masculine given names
Scottish masculine given names
Irish masculine given names
English masculine given names